Herman Christian Salling (born 20 November 1919 in Aarhus; died 8 May 2006) was a Danish merchant and director. He was a pioneer in the department store and retail business in Denmark.

Herman Salling was the son of local merchant Ferdinand Salling (1880 - 1953) who founded the Salling department store in 1906 in Aarhus. Herman inherited and became director of the Salling department store in 1953. He evolved the business and also started føtex in 1960, the first real supermarket in Denmark. With Danish shipping businessman A.P. Møller, he founded Dansk Supermarked A/S in 1964. In 1970, as part of the Dansk Supermarket Group, Herman Salling launched Bilka, the very first hypermarket in Denmark. Bilka is located in Tilst, a western suburb of Aarhus.

The Salling foundations 
A memorial fund for Herman's father Ferdinand Salling was established in 1957 and in 1964 Herman Salling established his own foundation. The two foundations are collectively known as "Salling Fondene" (The Salling Foundations) and support selected local cultural projects in Aarhus financially.

One of many donations went to the establishment of "Hermans" in 2013, a cultural venue in Tivoli Friheden, named after Herman Salling himself.

Sources 
 Salling.dk: Sallings Historie

References

External links 

20th-century Danish businesspeople
Knights of the Order of the Dannebrog
People from Aarhus
1919 births
2006 deaths
Burials at Nordre Cemetery